James Dow Morrison (1844–1934) was the first bishop of Duluth in the Episcopal Church in the United States of America.

Biography
James Dow Morrison was born in Waddington, New York on October 16, 1844.

He was consecrated bishop on February 2, 1897.

He died in Ogdensburg, New York on January 31, 1934.

References

1844 births
1934 deaths
People from Waddington, New York
People from Ogdensburg, New York
Episcopal bishops of Duluth